Akbayır is a neighbourhood in the Olur District of Erzurum Province in Turkey.

References

Villages in Olur District